The Pennsylvania State Game Lands Number 44 are Pennsylvania State Game Lands in Elk County in Pennsylvania in the United States providing hunting, bird watching, and other activities.

Geography
State Game Lands Number 44 is located in Horton, Ridgway and Spring Creek Townships in Elk County.

Horton
Ridgway
Spring Creek

Statistics

References

044
Protected areas of Elk County, Pennsylvania